The Hong Kong Premiership is the main domestic competition for rugby union clubs in Hong Kong organised by the Hong Kong Rugby Union. Valley RFC and Hong Kong FC are the two most popular clubs from the Hong Kong Premiership.

Teams

Most championships

 Hong Kong FC 10 Titles  
 Valley RFC 7 Titles
 Kowloon RFC 1 Titles

Grand Champions year by year
 2001  – Hong Kong FC
 2002  – Hong Kong FC
 2003  – Hong Kong FC
 2004  – Hong Kong FC
 2005  – Hong Kong FC
 2006  – Hong Kong FC
 2007  – Hong Kong FC
 2008  – Hong Kong FC
 2009  – Hong Kong FC
 2010  – Valley RFC
 2011  – Valley RFC
 2012  – Valley RFC
 2013  – Valley RFC
 2014  – Valley RFC
 2016  – Kowloon RFC
 2017  – Valley RFC
 2018  – Valley RFC
 2019  – Hong Kong FC
 2020  – No champion due to COVID 19
 2021  – No champion due to COVID 19
 2022  – No champion due to COVID 19
 2023  – Hong Kong FC

See also
 Rugby union in Hong Kong

References

National rugby union premier leagues
Rugby union competitions in Hong Kong
rugby union